Dillwynia oreodoxa is a species of flowering plant in the family Fabaceae and is endemic to Victoria, Australia. It is an erect shrub with glabrous foliage, linear leaves and yellow flowers with red markings.

Description

Taxonomy and naming
Dillwynia oreodoxa was first formally described in 1939 by William Blakely in The Australian Naturalist. The specific epithet (oreodoxa) is from Greek words meaning "pertaining to mountains" and "glory".

Distribution
This goodenia grows on rocky hillsides in woodland and forest in the Grampians National Park, south-western Victoria.

References

oreodoxa
Flora of Victoria (Australia)
Taxa named by William Blakely
Plants described in 1939